Dolga Gora is a settlement in the Municipality of Šentjur, in eastern Slovenia. The railway line from Ljubljana to Maribor runs through the settlement. The settlement, and the entire municipality, are included in the Savinja Statistical Region, which is in the Slovenian portion of the historical Duchy of Styria.

References

External links

Dolga Gora at Geopedia

Populated places in the Municipality of Šentjur